John Haydon may refer to:
 John A. Haydon, American surveyor and civil engineer
 John Morse Haydon, governor of American Samoa